Lu Min (also spelt Lu Minn) is a four-time Myanmar Academy Award-winning Burmese film actor and director. He has served as the Chairman of the Myanmar Motion Picture Organisation from 2014 to 2017. Throughout his successful career, he acted in over 1000 films.

Life
He was born and raised in Aungpan in Shan State. In 2008, he and his wife, Khin Sabe Oo became one of the first couples in Myanmar to receive fertility treatment via intracytoplasmic sperm injection. Their daughter Ayeyarwady Lu Min was born later that year.

In 2005, he produced and starred in the film Kyan Sit Min, base on the life story of the Pagan era's King Kyansittha, was the first in Burma to be shot on digital video format before being transferred to film, and perhaps the first Burmese movie in recent decades to score commercial success abroad.

On 17 February 2021, in the aftermath of the 2021 Myanmar coup d'état, authorities issued an arrest warrant for Lu Min for encouraging civil servants to join ongoing civil disobedience movement, along with several other celebrities.

On 20 February 2021, Lu Min was arrested by the military while in hiding.

Filmography
Kyan Sit Min (2005)
Mystery of Snow (2005)
Zero (2015) 
Professor Doctor Sait Phwar and Myaing Yar-Zar TarTay (2016)
Anubis (2016)
The Milk Ogre (2019)
Jin Party (2019)
Nyit Toon (2019)

Awards and nominations

References

Burmese male film actors
Living people
Burmese film directors
People from Shan State
Year of birth missing (living people)